Flim or FLIM may refer to:

Fluorescence-lifetime imaging microscopy
Jimmy Johnson (bassist) (born 1956), American bass guitarist
"Flim", a song by Aphex Twin from Come to Daddy, 1997
"Flim", a song by Mouse on Mars from Glam, 1998
Flim (Star Wars), a character in the Star Wars franchise
A misspelling of film

See also
Flims, a municipality in Switzerland
Flim-flam (disambiguation)
Film (disambiguation)